LaQuan Stallworth (born May 17) is a former professional women's basketball player. She played for coach Leon Barmore and Kim Mulkey to play for Louisiana Tech University. After successful collegiate playing years, LaQuan took her talents overseas for the next 7 years.

Professional 
Stallworth went to play international basketball for FIBA Maccabi Ashdod in Ashdod, Israel, Dynamo Kursk in Kursk, Russia, USA Junior Olympic Team, China, Germany (Halle), and Ireland for Burnell.  Stallworth was on the practice squad 2 times for WNBA Houston Comets (99 and 01)undrafted WNBA. Then 3 years of playing for the Adidas Travel Team. Stallworth retired from basketball in 2009. 
Stallworth is coach for the Houston Spirit and Houston Red Storm ABA (2013–present). She also train and develop the youth, participate in coaching AAU.

2018 - Named Coach of the Year - Texas Basketball Association

USA
1998 Jones Cup Team

College 
Attended Louisiana Tech University, LaQuan has a Bachelor’s of Science in Computer Information Systems.  LaTech women's basketball during her years went to 1 National championship as the runner-up, semi finals in the final four, and 2 years in the final 8 of the NCAA championships.  LaQuan currently holds several records at Louisiana Tech such as Defensive Player of the Year (3 years), Most Steals in Game, #3 in Assist, #1 in Most Assist in a Game, and Most NCAA Tournaments and the 2nd Player in Tech history to record over a 1000 pts and 500 assist.  She holds record for Most Assist in NCAA Tournament.

BASKETBALL WALL OF FAME

High school 
LaQuan attended Silsbee High school, which was coached by Kim Albers, started all 4 years, 2 State Tournaments Championships Runner-up and Gatorade (WBCA) All-American throughout all 4 years. She received awards such as MVP of District (4 years) and All-State 1st Team (4 years). Newcomer of the Year as a freshman in high school.  Stallworth's high school jersey was retired in 1995. Stallworth received the proclamation from the Mayor of Silsbee and placed on the Wall of Fame at Silsbee High School in 2016. She recorded 4,334 points at Silsbee High School. She was named one of the Top 100 Century athletes in the State of Texas. 

  She is named one of the greatest basketball player in the State of Texas.

Achievements
 Louisiana Tech Lady Techsters basketball Single-Game Steals Record
 Louisiana Tech Lady Techsters basketball 3rd All-Time Assists Leader
 Louisiana Tech Lady Techsters basketball 1st Single-Game Assists Record
 NCAA Tournament Assists Leader
 2nd Player in Louisiana Tech Lady Techsters basketball history to record over 1000 points and 500 assists

Personal
LaQuan is an active member of the NAACP.  She started playing basketball at the age of 4 years old. LaQuan is also a member of Delta Sigma Theta sorority.  
Stallworth wrote, produced, and directed her own indie film "Caught Between the Two" which discusses relationship issues and it was released in 2016 on Amazon.com.  Stallworth will be working on her 2nd film "Sins of a Scorned Wife" for 2017 to be released late 2017 or early 2018. It was released in May 2019. The film stars Paul Ynfante, Whitney Skye, and debuting actor Joseph “JoJo” Brooks.
Stallworth also coached in the men's American Basketball Association (ABA) as the Head Coach for the Houston Red Storm and minor league basketball team the Houston Spirit. 
The greatest joy that Stallworth does is give back to the community. She is active in the Boys & Girls Club, YMCA, and Meals on Wheels program.

She is very family oriented and she takes pride in her mother Karen Stallworth, who raised 3 kids as a single parent. (Brother - Trey Singleton and sister - Charity Edwards) with three nieces Jasmine Edwards, Taliyah Edwards, and Ariyian Singleton.

WALL OF FAME - BASKETBALL GREAT

IMdB

References

American Basketball Assoc -ABA

Year of birth missing (living people)
Living people
American women's basketball players
Louisiana Tech Lady Techsters basketball players
Guards (basketball)